Crooked Rain, Crooked Rain is the second studio album by American indie rock band Pavement, released on February 14, 1994 by Matador Records. The album saw the band move on towards a more accessible rock sound than that of their more lo-fi debut Slanted and Enchanted and achieve moderate success with the single "Cut Your Hair". The album also saw original drummer Gary Young replaced by Steve West. It was a UK Top 20 hit upon release, although it was not so successful in the US charts.

Release
Crooked Rain, Crooked Rain was released on February 14, 1994 by Matador Records. As of 2009, the album had sold about 500,000 copies.

In 2004, Matador released Crooked Rain, Crooked Rain: LA's Desert Origins, a compilation containing the album in its entirety, as well outtakes and other rarities from the same era.

Critical reception

AllMusic's Stephen Thomas Erlewine gave Crooked Rain a perfect 5-star rating, describing it as "the Reckoning to Slanted & Enchanteds Murmur". He concluded that the album was "a vibrant, dynamic, emotionally resonant album that stands as a touchstone of underground rock in the '90s and one of the great albums of its decade." Robert Christgau of the Village Voice gave the album an A grade, describing it as "a tour de force melodywise". Entertainment Weekly David Browne gave the album a B+, writing that "Crooked Rain, Crooked Rain is just a bunch of guys dwelling on topics like skateboarding, plane crashes, girls, and mocking Stone Temple Pilots. When they set those sentiments to bumpy-road drones or a bit of a country lilt...the result has a subtle, ingratiating beauty." Los Angeles Times critic Richard Cromelin gave the album 3.5 out of 4 stars. Cromelin wrote that the album contains "some of the Meat Puppets' loopiness, a Stones/Burritos folk-country resonance, and a chirpy pop tunefulness--along with enough contrary abrasiveness to keep you from getting too comfortable with them."

Legacy
In 2003, the album was ranked number 210 on Rolling Stone magazine's list of the 500 greatest albums of all time, and 212 in a 2012 revised list. In the 2020 update of the list, the album's rank dropped to number 434.  It was also ranked number 10 on their best albums of the Nineties. In 2003, it was ranked number 8 on Pitchforks list Top 100 Albums of the 1990s, and in 2010, the song "Gold Soundz" was listed as number one on Pitchforks 200 Greatest Songs of the 1990s. In July 2014, Guitar World ranked Crooked Rain, Crooked Rain at number 21 in their "Superunknown: 50 Iconic Albums That Defined 1994" list. The photo in the middle of the cover was taken from the March 1978 issue of National Geographic. The album was also included in the book 1001 Albums You Must Hear Before You Die.

Track listing

(*) Due to an ink splodge on the back of the original artwork, the song "Silence Kid" has become erroneously known as "Silence Kit". This misnomer persisted when designer Mark Ohe printed it onto the back of the reissue Crooked Rain, Crooked Rain: LA's Desert Origins, despite the interior artwork showing the correct name in print several times, including written in Stephen Malkmus' own handwriting.

Personnel
Credits adapted from the album's liner notes.

Pavement
Stephen Malkmus – vocals, guitar, bass
Scott Kannberg – guitar, vocals, organ, percussion
Mark Ibold – bass, vocals
Steve West – drums, percussion
Bob Nastanovich – percussion, vocals (credited)

Technical
Pavement – production
Bryce Goggin – engineer, mixing, piano 
Mark Venezia – engineer

Charts and certifications

Weekly charts

Certifications

Singles

See also
Crooked Rain, Crooked Rain: LA's Desert Origins

References

External links

Pavement (band) albums
1994 albums
Big Cat Records albums
Matador Records albums
Domino Recording Company albums
Rough Trade Records albums
Flying Nun Records albums